Jody is a unisex given name. For men, it is sometimes a short form (hypocorism) for Joseph and other names. Notable people with the given name include:

Men
Jody Azzouni (born 1954),  American philosopher, short fiction writer and poet
Jody Byrne (footballer) (born 1963), Irish retired footballer
Jody Campbell (born 1960), American former water polo player
Jody Carr (born 1975), Canadian politician
Jody Cortez (born 1960), American drummer
Jody Craddock (born 1975), English footballer
Jody Cundy (born 1978), English cyclist and former swimmer
Jody Davis (baseball) (born 1952), American Major League Baseball catcher
Jody Dean (born 1959), American journalist and author
Jody Dobrowski (1981-2005), English murder victim
Jody Fleisch (born 1980), English professional wrestler
Jody Fortson (born 1997), American football player
Jody Gage (born 1959), Canadian hockey player and general manager
Jody Gerut (born 1977), American former Major League Baseball player
Jody Gormley, Gaelic football manager and former player and coach
Jody Hamilton (1938–2021), American professional wrestler, promoter and trainer
Jody Harris, American guitarist, singer, songwriter and composer
Jody Hice (born 1960), American politician and syndicated radio show host
Jody Hill (born 1976), American film director and screenwriter
Jody Holden (born 1968), Canadian beach volleyball player
Jody Hull (born 1969), Canadian retired National Hockey League player
Jody Jenneker (born 1984), South African rugby union player
Jody Kollapen (born 1957), South African judge
Jody Kraus, law professor
Jody Latham (born 1982), English actor
Jody Lavender (born 1979), American racing driver
Jody Lehman (born 1975), Canadian-British professional ice hockey player
Jody Lloyd, New Zealand electronica and hip-hop musician and record producer
Jody McBrayer (born 1970), American singer and songwriter
Jody McCrea (1934–2009), American actor; son of actors Joel McCrea and Frances Dee
Jody Morris (born 1978), English footballer
Jody Payne (1936–2013), American country musician and singer
Jody Porter (born 1969), American guitarist
Jody Powell (1943–2009), White House Press Secretary for President Carter
Jody Reed (born 1962), American retired Major League Baseball player
Jody Reynolds (1932–2008), American singer and guitarist
Jody Richards (born 1938), American politician and member of the Kentucky House of Representatives
Jody Ridley (born 1942), former NASCAR driver
Jody Rosen (born 1969), American journalist, music critic and author
Jody Scheckter (born 1950), South African former auto racing driver
Jody Sears (born 1967), American college football coach and former player
Jody Shelley (born 1976), Canadian former National Hockey League player
Jody Stecher (born 1946), American singer and musician
Jody Stephens (born 1952), American drummer
Jody Stewart (born 1986), Costa Rican footballer
Jody Viviani (born 1982), French football goalkeeper
Jody Weiner, American novelist, non-fiction author and lawyer
Jody Weis, former Superintendent of Police of the Chicago Police Department (2008–2011)
Jody Williams (blues musician) (1935–2018), American blues guitarist and singer
Jody Wisternoff (born 1973), English musician, disc jockey and record producer

Women
Jody Jean Olson (born 1975), also known as India Summer, American pornographic actress
Jody Adams-Birch (born 1972), former women's basketball program head coach
Jody Anschutz (born 1962), American golfer
Jody Bleyle, American musician, songwriter and independent record label owner
Jody A. Breckenridge, US Coast Guard vice admiral
Jody Chiang (born 1961), Taiwanese retired singer
Jody Conradt (born 1941), retired women's basketball coach
Jody Diamond (born 1953), American composer, performer, writer, publisher, editor and educator
Jody Gibson (1957–2022), American Hollywood escort agency madam from the late 1980s through the 1990s
Jody Gladding (born 1955), American translator and poet
Jody Marie Gnant (born 1981),  American singer-songwriter and pianist
Jody Handley (born 1979), English former footballer
Jody Houser, American comic book writer
Jody Kennedy (born 1981), Australian actress
Jody Lawrance (1930–1986), American actress
Jody Lee (born 1958), American fantasy artist
Jody Linscott, American session musician and percussionist and children's book author
Jody Lynn Nye (born 1957), American science fiction writer
Jody-Anne Maxwell (born 1986), Jamaican Spelling Bee winner
Jody Miller (born Myrna Joy Miller in 1941), American country music singer
Jody Miller (criminologist), American criminology professor
Jody Patrick (born 1978), Canadian former badminton player
Jody Sperling, American dancer and choreographer
Jody Thompson (born 1976), Canadian actress
Jody Tini (born 1976), New Zealand basketball player
Jody Upshaw (born 2003), Canadian R&B musician
Jody Vance (born 1967), Canadian TV sports anchor
Jody Wagner (born 1955), American politician
Jody Watley (born 1959), American singer, songwriter and record producer
Jody Williams (born 1950), American political activist and Nobel Peace Prize laureate
Jody Williams (Afrikaans singer) (born 1990), South African pop/R&B singer

See also
Jodie
Jody (disambiguation)
Jodi (disambiguation)

English feminine given names
English unisex given names
Unisex given names
Hypocorisms